Ray Abrams may refer to:

 Ray Abrams (musician) (1920–1992), American jazz and jump blues tenor saxophonist
 Ray Abrams (animator) (1906–1981), American animator and director